The Quiet Science are an American Christian music band from Merritt Island, Florida, and they started making music together in 2008. They have released one extended play, He Calls Me Diamonds (2009), and three studio albums, [With/Without] (2010), Dark Words on Dark Wings (2011), and The Rekindling of the Stars (2016).

Background
The band originated in Merritt Island, Florida, in 2008, with the now husband-and-wife centerpiece Mark Nathan Walter and Daisy Elisabeth Walter (née Williamson), and they added two more musicians to the current roster, Mark Nicks and Josh Raucci. Their former band member was Daisy's brother Robert Wesley "Robbie" Williamson.

Music history
Their first extended play, He Calls Me Diamonds, was released on September 2, 2009. The subsequent release, a studio album, [With/Without], was released on May 4, 2010. They released, Dark Words on Dark Wings, on October 25, 2011. The third studio album, The Rekindling of the Stars, was released on May 6, 2016.

Members
Current members
 Mark Nathan Walter (born January 7, 1980)
 Daisy Elisabeth Walter (born January 10, 1986; née Williamson)
 Josh Raucci

Touring members
 Joey Osgood (guitar)
 Mark Wallace (drums)
 Rebecca Wallace (bass)

Former members
 Robert Wesley "Robbie" Williamson (drums)
 Mark Nicks (drums)

Former touring members
 Joshua Albritton (bass)
 Christopher Calhoun (bass)

Discography
Studio albums
 [With/Without] (May 4, 2010)
 Dark Words on Dark Wings (October 25, 2011)
 The Rekindling of the Stars (May 6, 2016)
 Worship ( April 23, 2021 )

EPs
 He Calls Me Diamonds (September 2, 2009)

References

External links

American Christian musical groups
Musical groups established in 2008
Musical groups from Florida
2008 establishments in Florida